The slimeskate (Dipturus pullopunctatus) is a species of fish in the family Rajidae. It is found on soft bottoms of the outer shelf and upper slope on the coast of South Africa and Namibia.

References

slime skate
Fish of Namibia
Marine fish of South Africa
Marine fauna of Southern Africa
slime skate
Taxonomy articles created by Polbot